Mahler is a crater on Mercury. It has a diameter of 103 kilometers. Its name was adopted by the International Astronomical Union (IAU) in 1976. Mahler is named for the Austrian composer Gustav Mahler, who lived from  1860 to 1911.

Kenkō crater is to the east of Mahler, and Hitomaro is to the north.

References

Impact craters on Mercury
Crater